The 1984 Virginia Slims of California was a women's tennis tournament played on indoor carpet courts at the Oakland Coliseum in Oakland, California in the United States that was part of the 1984 Virginia Slims World Championship Series. The tournament was held from January 9 through January 15, 1984. Eighth-seeded Hana Mandlíková won the singles title.

Finals

Singles
 Hana Mandlíková defeated  Martina Navratilova 7–6(8–6), 3–6, 6–4
 It was Mandlíková's 2nd title of the year and the 20th of her career.

Doubles
 Martina Navratilova /  Pam Shriver defeated  Rosie Casals /  Alycia Moulton 6–1, 6–2, 6–3
 It was Navratilova's 1st title of the year and the 180th of her career. It was Shriver's 1st title of the year and the 50th of her career.

Prize money

Reference

External links
 ITF tournament edition details

Virginia Slims of California
Silicon Valley Classic
Virginia Slims of California
Virginia Slims of California
Virginia Slims of California